Sitoh Yih Pin  (born 1963) is a Singaporean politician. A member of the governing People's Action Party (PAP), he has been the Member of Parliament (MP) representing Potong Pasir SMC since 2011.

An accountant by profession, Sitoh entered politics in the 2001 general election as a PAP candidate contesting against opposition Chiam See Tong, who had been representing Potong Pasir SMC since 1984, and lost with 47.57% of the vote against Chiam's 52.43%. 

He lost to Chiam again in the 2006 general election, but managed to win against Lina Loh, Chiam's wife, in the 2011 general election with 50.36% of the vote against her 49.64%. 

Since then, he has retained his parliamentary seat in Potong Pasir SMC after winning the general elections in 2015 and 2020.

Career

Accounting career 
Sitoh graduated from the National University of Singapore with a Bachelor of Accountancy in 1987. He is a registered chartered accountant in Singapore and Australia. Sitoh worked as an audit manager at KPMG before starting his own accounting firm, Nexia TS Public Accounting, in 1993.

Political career
Sitoh entered politics in the 2001 general election as a candidate of the governing People's Action Party (PAP) contesting in Potong Pasir SMC against Chiam See Tong, an opposition Member of Parliament who had been representing Potong Pasir SMC since 1984. Sitoh lost to Chiam after garnering 47.57% of the vote against Chiam's 52.43%.

Sitoh contested in Potong Pasir SMC against Chiam again in the 2006 general election and lost again with 44.18% of the vote against Chiam's 55.82%.

During the 2011 general election, Chiam left Potong Pasir SMC to contest in Bishan–Toa Payoh GRC. Chiam's wife, Lina Loh, contested in Potong Pasir SMC under the Singapore People's Party banner. Sitoh contested in Potong Pasir SMC against Loh and won by a mere 114 votes against her, receiving 50.36% of the vote against Loh's 49.64%. Sitoh thus became the Member of Parliament representing Potong Pasir SMC.

In the 2015 general election, Sitoh won again in Potong Pasir SMC against Lina Loh, garnering 66.39% of the vote and thus continuing as a Member of Parliament for a second term. In January 2017, Sitoh was co-opted into the PAP's Central Executive Committee.

Sitoh retained his parliamentary seat in the 2020 general election again after winning 60.67% of the vote against the Singapore People's Party's Jose Raymond. Sitoh is currently the chairman of the Potong Pasir Town Council and an advisor to the Potong Pasir Grassroots Organisations. He also serves as an executive member of the PAP Community Foundation.

Other appointments 
Sitoh had held and still holds executive and non-executive directorships on the boards of several companies, including Lian Beng Group, United Food Holdings, TalkMed Group and ISEC Healthcare.

References

External links
 Sitoh Yih Pin on Parliament of Singapore

Living people
People's Action Party politicians
Singaporean people of Cantonese descent
Hwa Chong Junior College alumni
National University of Singapore alumni
1964 births
Members of the Parliament of Singapore